Schiaparelli  is a lunar impact crater located on the western part of the Oceanus Procellarum, to the west of the crater Herodotus. The rim is relatively sharp-edged and relatively free from impact wear. The inner walls have slumped to form a shelf around much of the sides. The interior floor is somewhat irregular, but free from impacts of note.

This crater lies in a relatively flat and featureless part of the mare, although a ray streak from the distant crater Glushko passes along the southeastern edge of the rim, making it easy to identify. A low wrinkle ridge runs from the north rim of the crater to the north. Within the crater is a low central rise.

Satellite craters
By convention these features are identified on lunar maps by placing the letter on the side of the crater midpoint that is closest to Schiaparelli.

The following craters have been renamed by the IAU.

 Schiaparelli B — See Zinner (crater).
 Schiaparelli D — See Golgi (crater).

References

 
 
 
 
 
 
 
 
 
 
 
 

Impact craters on the Moon